Carinorbis is a genus of gastropods belonging to the family Amathinidae.

The species of this genus are found in Europe and Northern America.

Species:

Carinorbis burdigala 
Carinorbis clathrata 
Carinorbis lyra 
Carinorbis naticoides 
Carinorbis quadricostata 
Carinorbis sulcosa 
Carinorbis volumen

References

Amathinidae